Thukral  is an Indian surname from the Arora/Khatri community of Punjab and Rajput community of Himachal Pradesh. Variant spellings of the name include Thakral and Thukraal. Notable people with this surname include:
Nikita Thukral (born 1981), Indian film actress and model
Rajkumar Thukral, Indian politician and member of the Bharatiya Janata Party

Indian surnames
Punjabi-language surnames
Surnames of Indian origin
Hindu surnames
Khatri clans
Khatri surnames
Arora clans